Shelley Wellons Moore Capito (born November 26, 1953) is an American politician and retired educator serving in her second term as the junior United States senator from West Virginia, a post she has held since 2015. The daughter of three-term West Virginia governor Arch Alfred Moore Jr., she is the dean of West Virginia's congressional delegation.

Capito was the only Republican in West Virginia's congressional delegation until 2011, and the first Republican woman elected to Congress from West Virginia. She was the first woman elected to the U.S. Senate from West Virginia and the first Republican to win a full term in the Senate from West Virginia since 1942. She was reelected in 2020, defeating Democratic nominee Paula Jean Swearengin, and becoming the first West Virginia Republican reelected to the Senate since Reconstruction.

Since 2021, she has served as the ranking member of the Senate Environment Committee.

Early life and education
Shelley Wellons Moore Capito was born in Glen Dale, West Virginia, the daughter of Shelley (née Riley) and Arch Alfred Moore Jr., who served three terms as the state's governor. A resident of Charleston, Capito was educated at the Holton-Arms School, a private college-preparatory school in Bethesda, Maryland; Duke University, where she earned her bachelor's degree in zoology; and the University of Virginia Curry School of Education, where she earned her master's degree. She is a member of Kappa Kappa Gamma sorority and represented West Virginia as the 1972 Cherry Blossom Princess.

Early career 
After earning her master's degree, Capito was a career counselor at West Virginia State University and director of the educational information center for the West Virginia Board of Regents.

Capito was elected to Kanawha County's seat in the West Virginia House of Delegates in 1996, and served two terms, from 1996 to 2000.

U.S. House of Representatives

Elections

2000 
When U.S. Representative Bob Wise ran for governor in 2000, Capito ran as a Republican for the open seat in West Virginia's 2nd district. She defeated the Democratic nominee, lawyer Jim Humphreys, by two percentage points. She was the first Republican to represent West Virginia in Congress since 1983, as well as the first woman elected to Congress from West Virginia who was not the widow of a member of Congress.

2002 
Capito was reelected, defeating Humphreys again, 60%–40%.

2004 
Capito was reelected to a third term, defeating former newscaster Erik Wells 57%–41%.

2006 

Capito was mentioned as a possible challenger to Senator Robert Byrd in 2006, but opted to run for reelection to the House. She was reelected to a fourth term, defeating West Virginia Department of Environmental Protection Secretary Mike Callaghan, 57%–43%.

2008 

Capito was reelected to a fifth term, defeating Anne Barth, a former aide to Byrd, 57%–43%.

2010 

Capito was mentioned as a possible challenger to Joe Manchin for the vacated United States Senate seat of the late Robert Byrd. She decided against a Senate bid, and was reelected to a sixth term, defeating Virginia Lynch Graf, 68%–30%.

2012 

After redistricting, Capito was challenged in the Republican primary. She defeated Delegate Jonathan Miller and Michael Davis. She was reelected to a seventh term, defeating former gubernatorial aide Howard Swint, 70%–30%.

Committee assignments

 Committee on Financial Services
 Subcommittee on Financial Institutions and Consumer Credit (chair)
 Subcommittee on Insurance, Housing and Community Opportunity
 Committee on Transportation and Infrastructure
 Subcommittee on Highways and Transit
 Subcommittee on Railroads, Pipelines, and Hazardous Materials
 Subcommittee on Water Resources and Environment

Caucus memberships

Capito is a former chair of the Congressional Caucus for Women's Issues and a member of the Congressional Arts Caucus and the Afterschool Caucuses. After the Upper Big Branch Mine Disaster, Capito founded the Congressional Coal Caucus.

Tenure 
Capito served on the House Page Board during the Mark Foley congressional page incident, in which Foley, a Republican representative from Florida, sent sexually explicit messages to teenage boys who had previously served as Congressional pages. According to Capito, she wasn't aware of Foley's conduct until informed by the press.

U.S. Senate

Elections

2014

On November 26, 2012, Capito announced her candidacy for the United States Senate in 2014, intending to challenge Democratic incumbent Jay Rockefeller, who subsequently announced his retirement. Despite initial protests from Tea Party groups and anti-establishment conservatives that her House voting record was "too liberal", Capito won 87% of the Republican primary vote, and defeated Democratic Secretary of State Natalie Tennant in the general election, 62% to 34%.

2020

In her 2020 reelection campaign, Capito easily defeated Republican primary challengers Allen Whitt and Larry Butcher, before facing Democratic nominee Paula Jean Swearengin in the general election. Swearengin, a progressive activist whose 2018 U.S. Senate campaign was featured in the Netflix documentary Knock Down the House, defeated state senator Richard Ojeda and former South Charleston mayor Richie Robb in the Democratic primary race.

In the November general election, Capito defeated Swearengin with over 70% of the vote.

Tenure 

On January 5, 2016, Mitch McConnell appointed Capito as counsel to the majority leader, along with Rob Portman and Deb Fischer.

Committee assignments 
 Committee on Appropriations
 Subcommittee on Commerce, Justice, Science, and Related Agencies
 Subcommittee on Financial Services and General Government 
 Subcommittee on Interior, Environment, and Related Agencies
 Subcommittee on Labor, Health and Human Services, Education, and Related Agencies
 Subcommittee on Military Construction, Veterans Affairs, and Related Agencies
 Subcommittee on Transportation, Housing and Urban Development, and Related Agencies
 Committee on Commerce, Science, and Transportation
 Subcommittee on Aviation Operations, Safety, and Security
 Subcommittee on Communications, Technology, Innovation, and the Internet
 Subcommittee on Consumer Protection, Product Safety, Insurance and Data Security
 Subcommittee on Space, Science, and Competitiveness
 Subcommittee on Surface Transportation and Merchant Marine Infrastructure, Safety, and Security
 Committee on Environment and Public Works
 Subcommittee on Clean Air and Nuclear Safety
 Subcommittee on Fisheries, Water and Wildlife
 Subcommittee on Transportation and Infrastructure
 Committee on Rules and Administration

Caucus memberships 

 Republican Main Street Partnership

Political positions
Capito has voted with her party 96% of the time. She is considered relatively moderate and has crossed the aisle on some votes. In 2017, The New York Times and The Washington Post reported that Capito was one of the three most moderate Republican senators according to a study by DW-NOMINATE. In June 2019, The Lugar Center and McCourt School of Public Policy ranked Capito the seventh most bipartisan member of Congress based on her tenure in the House and Senate. According to FiveThirtyEight, as of October 2022, Capito has voted with President Biden's position about 53.7% of the time.

Donald Trump's candidacy and presidency 

In 2016, Capito raised concerns about Trump's tone and rhetoric during the election. After the Access Hollywood tape emerged, Capito said he should "reexamine his candidacy." But she later said she supported Trump for president. In 2020, Capito said she would be "impartial" and "fair" to both sides during Trump's Senate trial after his impeachment in the House, and voted to acquit him. According to FiveThirtyEight, she had voted with the Trump administration's position 94.9% of the time.

As of November 19, 2020, Capito had not publicly acknowledged that Joe Biden won the 2020 presidential election, though it had been called by all major media and analysts. By November 23, she issued a statement recognizing that Biden would be the next president. By December 5, she was among only 27 Congressional Republicans to acknowledge Biden as the winner of the election. Trump subsequently attacked them, calling them RINOs.

On May 28, 2021, Capito voted against creating the January 6 commission. Asked about Trump's future role in the Republican Party, she said she partially blamed Trump for the "insurrection" and that she does not think he will be the GOP nominee for president in 2024.

Social policy
Capito is a sponsor of the Gender Advancement in Pay (GAP) Act, saying, "it should be common sense that women and men get equal pay for equal work" and expressing concern about sex discrimination against women in the workplace. She is a sponsor of the Rural Access to Hospice Act to improve the quality, access, and retention of hospice facilities in rural parts of the nation. She opposes the Freedom to Vote Act which, among other reforms, would establish Election Day as a public holiday and "ensure states have early voting for federal elections, overhaul how congressional districts are redrawn and impose new disclosures on donations to outside groups active in political campaigns."   On social policy, the National Journal gave Capito a score of 54% conservative and 43% liberal.

LGBT rights 
Capito has a mixed record on LGBT issues. The Human Rights Campaign gave her a score of 30% in the 113th Congress and 64% in the 114th Congress. She received a 0% score in the 115th Congress and a 10% in the 116th Congress.

In 2004 and 2006, Capito voted for the Federal Marriage Amendment, which intended to ban same-sex marriage in the United States. But in 2015, she said she believed marriage was a state issue. In 2007 Capito voted against the Employment Non-Discrimination Act and against repealing the Don't Ask Don't Tell policy.

In 2009, Capito voted for the 2009-2010 Defense Appropriations bill, which expanded the legal definition of a hate crime to include crimes committed because of someone's gender identity. Also that year, she voted against legislation that defined hate crimes as including those committed because of someone's sexual orientation. In 2013, she voted to reauthorize the Violence Against Women Act, which includes provisions to assist victims regardless of sexual orientation or gender identity and prohibits funding programs that discriminate.

In 2015, Capito voted for an amendment to the Runaway and Homeless Youth Act that provided support and protections for LGBT youth. In 2015, she voted to give same-sex married couples access to Social Security and veterans' benefits. In 2017, Capito disagreed with President Trump's use of Twitter to announce a ban on transgender troops in the military, saying, "we should be thankful for any American who selflessly serves our country to defend our freedoms." In 2021, she released a statement that she opposed the inclusion of trans youth in the sporting programs of their gender identity; in particular, she opposed the inclusion of trans girls in girls' sporting teams and introduced legislation to ban trans girls from participating.

In response to the Supreme Court's decision in Obergefell v. Hodges, which found a constitutional right to same-sex marriage, Capito said, "While I would have preferred that the Supreme Court leave this decision to the states, it is my hope that all West Virginians will move forward and continue to care for and respect one another." In November 2022, Capito was one of 12 Republicans voting to advance legislation, the Respect for Marriage Act, to codify same-sex marriage into federal law; referring to civil same-sex marriage as a "civil partnership," Capito said that the "legislation will allow those who have entered into a civil partnership since the Supreme Court’s 2015 ruling in Obergefell v. Hodges, to continue to have their partnerships respected for federal benefit purposes." She voted for the final passage of the Respect for Marriage Act on November 29, 2022.

Abortion 
Capito had described herself as "pro-choice," or pro-abortion rights, but has a mixed record on abortion. She had previously been among the few Republican senators who publicly supported Roe v. Wade, the Supreme Court decision ruling abortion bans unconstitutional. But in 2020, she declared her support for March for Life, an anti-abortion movement, and in 2022, she reversed her position on Roe, saying she believes states should be free to ban abortion. She supports legal abortion in cases when the pregnant patient's health is at risk and said abortions should be rare. She has mixed ratings from anti-abortion organizations opposing abortion and abortion rights organizations advocating legal abortion. In 2002, her third-largest contributor was The WISH List, an abortion rights PAC. In 2000, she received support from Republicans for Choice. She has been endorsed by West Virginians for Life, an anti-abortion PAC, the WISH List, and by Republican Majority for Choice, an abortion rights PAC.

Capito voted against federal funding for abortion and for the Partial-Birth Abortion Ban Act, but against banning family-planning funding in US aid. She previously opposed the Hyde Amendment, but now supports it. She supported federal funding for family planning in the House but voted to require parental consent for minors seeking an abortion. She opposed banning funds for mifepristone, the "abortion pill". She voted for spending bills funding Planned Parenthood and against a bill to defund it, but has also voted to defund Planned Parenthood. She is against bans on abortion after six weeks of pregnancy, but supports banning abortion after 20 weeks. She voted with her party in 2018 to ban federal funding for facilities that promote abortion. Capito supports other anti-abortion legislation supported by her party. In 2021, she signed a letter put forward by the Senate's anti-abortion caucus opposing the repeal of the Hyde Amendment and opposing legislation to liberalize current federal abortion laws.

In 2017, "West Virginians for Life, said [it] still supports Capito, despite the abortion rights self-identification and support for Roe v. Wade, because of Capito's steadfast voting record restricting abortions and defunding Planned Parenthood". In 2018, Capito said she was neutral on an initiative to ban abortion in West Virginia. She supported Trump's Supreme Court nominee Brett Kavanaugh; when asked about Roe, Capito said she does not think the court will overturn the ruling. "Fundamentally, it's been a precedent for a long time," she said. Capito also supported Trump's nomination of Amy Coney Barrett to the Supreme Court. Barrett signed a letter calling for the end of Roe v. Wade, and supported a group that holds that life begins at fertilization. In 2020, Capito declined to sign an amicus brief asking the Supreme Court to reconsider Roe. Also in 2021, she was one of just three Senate Republicans (with Susan Collins and Lisa Murkowski) to decline to sign amicus briefs in the Mississippi case that seeks to ban abortion after 15 weeks of pregnancy. Asked about a 2022 draft Supreme Court opinion that would overturn Roe v. Wade, reportedly joined by Barrett, Kavanaugh, and Neil Gorsuch, all of whom Capito voted to confirm, she responded by criticizing the leak of the draft and said, "this is a draft opinion that is not binding Supreme Court precedent. Roe still remains the law of the land until the Supreme Court issues its final ruling." After the Supreme Court overturned Roe in the Dobbs v. Jackson Women's Health Organization decision, Capito said she supported the court's decision and believed the issue should be decided at the state level. In September 2022, Capito said she was opposed to a national 15-week abortion ban proposed by Senator Lindsey Graham of South Carolina.

Sexual assault 
Capito is partnering with Democrats Kirsten Gillibrand, Patty Murray, Amy Klobuchar and other bipartisan congress people to update the Congressional Accountability Act of 1995. In August 2018, She and Senator Joe Manchin announced $899,927 for the West Virginia Foundation for Rape Information and Services through the U.S. Department of Justice's Office on Violence Against Women.

Embryonic stem-cell research 
Capito supports embryonic stem cell research. In 2001, Capito voted for a bill to ban the cloning of human embryos. In May 2005, as a representative, Capito broke with her party, voting with a majority of Democrats, to repeal restrictions on embryonic stem-cell research funding. Capito also voted in 2006 to attempt to override President Bush's veto of the 2005 bill. Also in 2007, Capito again voted in favor of funding stem-cell research. She also voted in favor of research using stem cells derived from donated embryos. In 2009, Capito voted for a budget bill that prohibited the creation of human embryos for research.

Gun rights 
Capito was endorsed by the National Rifle Association (NRA) and West Virginia Citizen's Defense League which both support gun owners' rights in 2014. In 2016, Capito voted in favor of alerting law enforcement when a person suspected of terrorism attempts to purchase a firearm and in favor of an amendment to improve the National Instant Background Check System, but she voted against two other gun control amendments. In 2018, Capito opposed President Trump's suggestion that teachers be armed saying "I don't think a teacher should carry a gun in a classroom." In January 2019, Capito was one of thirty-one Republican senators to cosponsor the Constitutional Concealed Carry Reciprocity Act, a bill introduced by John Cornyn and Ted Cruz that would grant individuals with concealed carry privileges in their home state the right to exercise this right in any other state with concealed carry laws while concurrently abiding by that state's laws. Capito stated she was open to supporting red flag laws. As of 2020, the National Rifle Association has given her a rating of 92%, for supporting their positions, and Gun Owners of America gives her a 69% rating.

Healthcare 
As a representative, Capito voted against the Patient Protection and Affordable Care Act (commonly called ObamaCare or the Affordable Care Act) in March 2010. Since then, she had voted repeatedly to repeal the Affordable Care Act. In July 2017, Capito opposed repealing the ACA without a replacement proposal, and was one of three Republican senators, along with Susan Collins and Lisa Murkowski, who blocked a bill to repeal the ACA without a replacement early in the attempted repeal process. Later that July, she voted to repeal the ACA.

She was one of a few Republicans who broke with their party in favor of the State Children's Health Insurance Program. In January 2009, Capito voted to expand the Children's Health Insurance Program (CHIP) as part of its re-authorization. The expanded coverage would include about four million more children in the program. In May 2008, Capito voted for the Post-9/11 Veterans Educational Assistance Act of 2008 (commonly called the new G.I. Bill), which expanded the educational benefits for military veterans who have served since September 11, 2001. During the 112th Congress, she voted for H.R. 525 to expand the ACA grant programs. In 2014, she supported repealing the Affordable Care Act.

On March 3, 2017, Capito supported preserving the ACA's Medicaid expansion in any GOP bill to repeal it . With three other Republicans, Capito signed a letter opposing the House plan to repeal the ACA. She opposed the Better Care Reconciliation Act because of her opposition to an amendment to the bill as well as over opioid issues. She was one of seven Republicans who voted against repealing the ACA without a replacement.

In 2018, Capito voted for the bipartisan Opioid Crisis Response Act to address the nation's opioid crisis. She also voted to increase Telemedicine funding in five West Virginia counties.

In January 2019, Capito was a cosponsor of the Community Health Investment, Modernization, and Excellence (CHIME) Act, a bipartisan bill that would continue federal funding of community health centers and the National Health Service Corps (NHSC) beyond that year's September 30 deadline for five years and provide both with yearly federal funding increases beginning in fiscal year 2020. In 2021, she announced support for increasing funding for virtual healthcare options, and she co-sponsored bipartisan legislation to expand seniors' access to Telehealth, with "virtual [healthcare] visits." She supports extending Medicare to cover therapies to prevent diabetes.

Immigration 
Capito has stated that she does not support a pathway to citizenship for undocumented immigrants, but did vote against a 2004 bill that would have forced hospitals to report undocumented immigrants; she also voted in favor of a 2001 bill that proposed to allow some immigrants to "remain in the country while pursuing residency." In 2010, Capito voted against the DREAM Act. In 2018, Capito said of DACA and immigration, "It's probably going to be some sort of legal status for DACA recipients that gives them the permanence of legal status and then the border security..." Speaking about her views on DACA, Capito's office said that she "could support an immigration solution that provides for increased border security to protect Americans and provides relief for those in the DACA program. She is encouraged by ongoing negotiations between the Trump Administration and members of Congress to improve immigration policy and add resources for enforcement."

In 2018, Capito voted to withhold federal funding from sanctuary cities, voted against the McCain-Coons proposal to offer a pathway to citizenship without funding for a border wall, voted against Senator Collins' bipartisan bill to increase funding for border security and offer a pathway to citizenship, and voted in favor of Trump's proposal to offer a pathway to citizenship for 1.8 million undocumented immigrants while reducing legal immigration numbers and using federal funds to build a border wall. In December, 2018, Capito supported a bipartisan compromise funding bill that would have given $1.6 billion, instead of the $5 billion requested by Trump, toward a border wall to avoid a government shutdown.

Capito voiced disagreement with Trump's "zero-tolerance" policy that included separating children from their parents or guardians. She said "we need to keep the families together," speaking to the media. In 2019, she supported legislation to increase funding and humanitarian aid for "relief and comfort for migrants" on the US southern border. She also voted in committee for a bipartisan plan with $4.6 billion in funding with "$2.9 billion for the care of migrant children and $1.3 billion to improve facilities at the border."

Special interest groups for and against immigration reform have given Capito mixed ratings. NumbersUSA, which opposes illegal immigration and seeks to reduce legal immigration, gave Capito an 81% score and the Federation for American Immigration Reform, which also opposes illegal immigration and wants to reduce legal immigration, gave her an 88% score; conversely, the Hispanic Federation and UnidosUS, which both support immigration, gave Capito a 59% rating.

Drug policy 
Capito disagreed with U.S. Attorney General Jeff Sessions's 2018 memo on marijuana-related prosecutions, saying, "I'm going to go on the record as saying I'm against recreational marijuana, but I respect the states' rights to make that decision". She also said that she had concerns, but accepted and supported the legalization of medical marijuana. She received a 42% rating from the National Organization for the Reform of Marijuana Laws, which supports the decriminalization of marijuana.

Environmental policy 
Capito has received at lifetime rating of 17% from the League of Conservation Voters, indicating an anti-environment voting record. In 2018, she voted for a bill that would curtail the federal government's ability to regulate fracking. She has also voted to restrict the Department of the Interior's ability to regulate methane emissions.

In February 2019, in response to reports of the EPA intending to decide against setting drinking water limits for perfluorooctane sulfonic acid (PFOS) and perfluorooctanoic acid (PFOA) as part of an upcoming national strategy to manage the aforementioned class of chemicals, Capito was one of 20 senators to sign a letter to Acting EPA Administrator Andrew R. Wheeler calling on the EPA "to develop enforceable federal drinking water standards for PFOA and PFOS, as well as institute immediate actions to protect the public from contamination from additional per- and polyfluoroalkyl substances (PFAS)." In 2020, she cosponsored legislation with fellow West Virginia Senator Joe Manchin to "enhance a tax credit that Congress expanded in 2018 to spur investment in carbon capture technology."

Foreign policy
Capito has sponsored approximately 40 bills about international trade and international finance, the most of any other legislative topic during her career. Capito has criticized the vulnerabilities in current national security policy in the wake of the 2015 San Bernardino attack and has sponsored 8 bills on the military and national security. Capito was one of 47 Republican senators to sign Senator Tom Cotton's open letter to the Iranian government in 2015. The letter, which sought to dissuade Iran from reaching an agreement with President Barack Obama regarding nuclear peace, was described by the White House as "undercutting foreign policy".

In April 2017, Capito co-sponsored the Israel Anti-Boycott Act (S. 720), which would make it a federal crime for Americans to encourage or participate in boycotts against Israel and Israeli settlements in the occupied Palestinian territories if protesting actions by the Israeli government.

On foreign policy, the National Journal gave her a score of 77% conservative and 15% liberal.

International trade
In 2005, Capito voted against the Dominican Republic–Central America Free Trade Agreement (CAFTA), the major trade agreement negotiated under President George W. Bush. She voted Yes in 2003, 2004, and 2007 to approve free trade agreements with Chile, Singapore, Australia, and Peru. She supports tariffs against countries that manipulate currencies, and she sponsored a bill that would create an import fee on countries with an undervalued currency.

Interior policy
Capito supports the Republican Main Street Partnership's motion to elevate the EPA to be a Cabinet-level department, which would bring more oversight to the entity.

Capito opposes legislation aimed at capping greenhouse gas emissions. In January 2010, she reportedly asked the president if he would reconsider "job-killing" policies like limiting greenhouse gases.

In March 2011, Capito and other members of West Virginia's House delegation co-sponsored a campaign to allow the remains of the last American living veteran of World War I, Frank Buckles, to lie in state at the Capitol rotunda. The move, requested by Buckles's family, had been blocked by Senate Majority Leader Harry Reid and House Speaker John Boehner. Reid and Boehner supported a special ceremony at the Arlington National Cemetery. Capito said, "This is a matter close to the hearts of many West Virginians, but everyone can appreciate the desire to come together one last time to respect and remember America’s last doughboy". The campaign was unsuccessful and Buckles lay in honor at the Arlington National Cemetery.

Capito supported Trump's decision to withdraw from the Paris climate agreement. She called the decision "the right decision for the American economy and workers in West Virginia and across the country." She supports regulations implemented by the EPA, based on her bipartisan legislation, to increase clean water standards.

Fiscal policy
In 2016, the fiscally conservative PAC the Club for Growth gave her a 50% lifetime rating. In 2011, while in the House, Capito voted for a Balanced Budget Amendment to the United States Constitution. In 2020, she said she is opposed to cuts to government spending, but also opposes any increases.

In December 2010, Capito voted to extend the tax cuts enacted during the administration of President George W. Bush.

Capito supports a federal prohibition on online poker, an in 2006, was a cosponsor of H.R. 4777, the Internet Gambling Prohibition and Enforcement Act. She also supported H.R. 4411, the Goodlatte-Leach Internet Gambling Prohibition Act. In June 2003, Capito introduced the Family Fairness in Taxing Act of 2003. The bill would accelerate the increase to the child tax credit, increase the qualification age for children, and revise refundability criteria for the credit.

In 2001, then Rep. Capito voted in favor of the Bush tax cuts. In 2002, she supported partially privatizing Social Security but opposed complete privatization. In 2006, Capito joined Democrats to vote for an increase of the minimum wage. In 2012, during her campaign for the Senate, the Senate Conservative Fund opposed Capito's nomination as they argued "her spending record in the House is too liberal." In 2013, she voted against cutting funding for food stamps. In 2017, Capito opposed the budget proposed by President Trump saying that the proposal would cut "too close to the bone." In 2017, Capito noted that she supports fully repealing the Estate Tax. She also voted in favor of Trump's tax cut bill. In 2019, she came out against budget cuts being proposed by the Trump administration. Capito was among a few Republicans, including Joni Ernst of Iowa and Susan Collins of Maine, who expressed criticism of Trump's nominee to the Federal Reserve, Stephen Moore, because of comments he had made about women, and he ultimately withdrew his nomination. In 2019, Capito announced support for paid family leave. In 2020, she opposed budget cuts due to the "spending needs" of states like West Virginia. On September 30, 2021, she was among 15 Senate Republicans to vote with all Democrats and both Independents for a temporary spending bill to avoid a government shutdown. On October 7, 2021, she was one of 11 Republicans voting with all members of the Democratic caucus to end a filibuster on raising the debt ceiling. However, she voted against the bill to raise the debt ceiling. On August 10, 2021, Capito was one of 19 Senate Republicans to vote with the Democratic caucus in favor of the Infrastructure Investment and Jobs Act. On economic issues, the National Journal gave her a rating of 53% conservative and 47% liberal.

Judiciary 

Capito opposed having a hearing for President Obama's nominee, Merrick Garland, to the Supreme Court due to the nomination's proximity to the 2016 presidential election. In 2017, she voted to confirm President Trump's first Supreme Court nominee, Neil Gorsuch. After President Trump named a second Supreme Court nominee, Capito announced her support for the nominee, Brett Kavanaugh, and after he was accused of sexual assault, she continued to support his nomination. However, she also said she considered the allegation to be serious and was among the handful of Republican Senators asking for a vote to be delayed in order to hear from the accuser and from Kavanaugh. Some of her fellow alumnae from the Holton-Arms School personally delivered to her a letter signed by more than a thousand alumnae of the school, saying that they believe Kavanaugh's accuser because her allegations are "all too consistent with stories we heard and lived" while attending Holton-Arms.

In March 2019, Capito was one of 12 senators to cosponsor a resolution that would impose a constitutional amendment limiting the Supreme Court to nine justices. The resolution was introduced after multiple Democratic presidential candidates expressed openness to the idea of expanding the seats on the Supreme Court.

In September 2020, less than two months before the next presidential election, Capito supported an immediate vote on Trump's nominee to fill the Supreme Court vacancy caused by Justice Ruth Bader Ginsburg's death. In March 2016, Capito took the opposite position when facing Obama's nominee, saying that a justice should not be considered during a presidential election year because "West Virginians and the American people should have the ability to weigh in at the ballot box". As of November 2021, Capito had a mixed voting record on Biden's judicial nominees.

Vice presidential speculation
Capito was considered a possible contender for vice president on the Republican ticket with Donald Trump in 2016, and in May 2016 she was one of several senators to meet with Trump in Washington, D.C. In the end, Trump picked Indiana Governor and former U.S. Representative Mike Pence to join him on the Republican ticket.

Electoral history

Personal life 
Capito is married to Charles L. Capito, and they have three children: sons Charles and Moore, and daughter Shelley. Her father served over two years in prison on corruption charges. Her sister, Lucy Moore Durbin, was arrested in 1992 along with her husband for selling cocaine to an undercover officer. Capito and the Moore Capito family are members of First Presbyterian Church in Charleston, West Virginia, a congregation of the Presbyterian Church (USA).

In September 2015, Runner's World featured Capito in its "I'm a Runner" vlog, where she states she has been a distance runner for over 30 years.

See also
 Women in the United States House of Representatives
 Women in the United States Senate

References

External links

 Senator Shelley Moore Capito official U.S. Senate website
 Shelley Moore Capito for Senate 
 
 
 

|-

|-

|-

|-

|-

|-

1953 births
20th-century American politicians
20th-century American women politicians
21st-century American politicians
21st-century American women politicians
Curry School of Education alumni
Duke University alumni
Female members of the United States House of Representatives
Female United States senators
Living people
Republican Party members of the West Virginia House of Delegates
Moore family of West Virginia
People from Glen Dale, West Virginia
Politicians from Charleston, West Virginia
Republican Party members of the United States House of Representatives from West Virginia
Republican Party United States senators from West Virginia
Women in West Virginia politics
Women state legislators in West Virginia
Presbyterians from West Virginia
Beauty queen-politicians